Wille may refer to:

 Wille (surname)
 Ville (name), a popular male given name in Finland, sometimes spelled Wille